B. Baktavatsalu Naidu was an Indian politician of the Indian National Congress, and a member of the Legislative Assembly of Madras state. He served as the Deputy Speaker of the Madras Legislative Assembly from 1952 to 1967.

Notes 

Tamil Nadu politicians
Deputy Speakers of the Tamil Nadu Legislative Assembly